The 2016–17 SV Wehen Wiesbaden season is the 91st season in the football club's history. For the 8th consecutive season, Wehen Wiesbaden play in the 3. Liga. They also are participating in this season's edition of the Hessian Cup. The season covers a period from 1 July 2016 to 30 June 2017.

Players

Squad

Competitions

3. Liga

League table

Results summary

Results by round

Matches

Hessian Cup

References

SV Wehen Wiesbaden seasons
Wehen Wiesbaden, SV